A tetrapylon ("four gates"), plural tetrapyla, known in Latin as a quadrifrons (literally "four fronts") is a type of ancient Roman monument of cubic shape, with a gate on each of the four sides, generally built on a crossroads.

Overview

The tetrapylon was a type of monument common in the Classical architecture.  The defining quality of this form is the  concept of four gates, with four pillars or other supporting structures placed at the corners marking the divisions between them.  A tetrapylon could take the form of a single building or multiple, separate structures.  They were built as landmarks at significant crossroads or geographical "focal points", as a sub-type of the Roman triumphal arch, or simply as decorative and aesthetically pleasing ornamental architecture.  As applied to a triumphal arch (e.g., the Mausoleum of the Julii at Glanum, Arch of Janus, Rutupiae), a tetrapylon was effectively a 'doubling' of the original form; with a total of four major arched openings, one on each side of the structure (one pair of openings opposite each other along one axis, and a second pair of openings of equal or lesser prominence perpendicular to the first pair; hence a structure with two barrel vaulted passageways, in the form of a cross).

Tetrakionion

A tetrakionion (τετρακιόνιον), plural tetrakionia, is a type of tetrapylon in which the central crossing is not roofed, and the four corner-markers exist as four separate structures (i.e.:  unconnected overhead).

Notable tetrapyla

 the Arch of Galerius at Thessaloniki (Salonica) in Greece
 the Arch of Septimius Severus (Leptis Magna) in Libya
 the Arch of Marcus Aurelius at Oea in Tripoli in Libya
 at Cáparra in Spain
 at Palmyra in Syria
 a monumental gateway at Aphrodisias in Turkey is considered a tetrapylon
 Milion, a mile marker in Ancient Constantinople
 the Arch of Janus in Rome
 the Arch of Caracalla (Thebeste) in Theveste
 in Anjar (in the Bekaa Valley) at the intersection of Cardo Maximus and Decumanus Maximus streets
 two in Jerash (Jordan): one at the intersection of northern-decumanus and cardo maximus and the other at the intersection of southern-Decumanus and cardo maximus.
 the demolished Roman arch at Richborough Castle in southern England
 Heidentor at Carnuntum, Austria

See also

Chartaq

References

Ancient Roman buildings and structures